Victor Herbert is a compilation album of phonograph records by Bing Crosby and Frances Langford of songs written by Victor Herbert.

Track listing
These songs were featured on a 3-disc, 78 rpm album set, Decca Album No. A-505.

Disc 1 (23814):A.   "I'm Falling in Love with Someone"B.   "Gypsy Love Song"Disc 2 (23815):A.   "Ah! Sweet Mystery of Life"B.   "Sweethearts"Disc 3 (23816):A.   "When You're Away"B.   "Thine Alone"

LP track listing
Decca released a 45rpm set of 7" vinyl titled Bing Crosby Sings Victor Herbert Songs Decca 9-111 in 1951 containing the same songs with the addition of "I Might Be Your Once-in-a-While" and "Indian Summer" and a 10" vinyl LP Bing Crosby Sings Victor Herbert Songs Decca DL 5355 with the same track listing. Recording dates follow song titles.

References

Bing Crosby compilation albums
1947 compilation albums
Decca Records compilation albums